Downholland Brook is a  river (brook) in Merseyside, England, that is a tributary to the River Alt in the Alt catchment. Rising from Barton Brook in the Metropolitan Borough of Knowsley, the river flows a westerly course until reaching Moss Side, when it turns north towards Little Altcar in the Metropolitan Borough of Sefton. There, it flows into the River Alt.

Water quality 
Water quality of the brook in 2019, according to the Environment Agency, a non-departmental public body sponsored by the United Kingdom's Department for Environment, Food and Rural Affairs:

References 

Rivers of Merseyside
Tributaries of the Alt